ROH Respect Is Earned was a professional wrestling pay-per-view (PPV) event produced by Ring of Honor.

Events

References

External links
ROH Wrestling.com